The 2023 AFC U-20 Asian Cup was the 41st edition of the AFC U-20 Asian Cup (including previous editions of the AFC Youth Championship and AFC U-19 Championship), the biennial international youth football championship organised by the Asian Football Confederation (AFC) for the men's under-20 national teams of Asia. This edition is the first to be played as an under-20 tournament, as the AFC proposed to switch the tournament from under-19 to under-20 starting from 2023. Moreover, the tournament was also rebranded from the "AFC U-19 Championship" to the "AFC U-20 Asian Cup". On 25 January 2021, the AFC announced that Uzbekistan would retain hosting rights for the 2023 edition after the cancellation of the 2020 AFC U-19 Championship due to the COVID-19 pandemic.

A total of 16 teams are playing in the tournament. The top four teams of the tournament, Japan, Iraq, South Korea and Uzbekistan, qualified for the 2023 FIFA U-20 World Cup in Indonesia as the AFC representatives besides Indonesia who automatically qualified as hosts.

Saudi Arabia were the title holders, having won the title in 2018, but were eliminated from the group stage and thus failed to defend the title.

Qualification

Qualification matches were played between 10–18 September 2022.

Qualified teams
A total of 16 teams including hosts Uzbekistan qualified for the final tournament. Countries that initially qualified for the 2020 AFC U-19 Championship but missed out this edition included Bahrain, Cambodia, Laos, Malaysia and Yemen. China and Jordan marked their return after initially failed to qualify in the previous edition. Kyrgyzstan qualified for the first time since 2006, Syria returned to the tournament since 2012 and Oman returned after the 2014 edition.

Venues 
The matches are being played on four venues at two cities across Uzbekistan.

Trophy 
AFC has uploaded pictures of the new AFC U20 Asian Cup 2023 on their social media pages on March 18, 2023.

Match officials
On February 2023, AFC announced a total of 13 referees (including one woman) and 15 assistant referees (including two women) appointed for the tournament.

Referees

  Casey Reibelt
  Ammar Mahfoodh
  Chen Hsin-chuan
  Tam Ping Wun
  Zaid Thamer
  Abdullah Jamali
  Nazmi Nasaruddin
  Qasim Al-Hatmi
  Majed Al-Shamrani
  Kim Woo-sung
  Sadullo Gulmurodi
  Yahya Al-Mulla
  Akhrol Risqullaev

Assistant referees

  Faisal Al-Awi
  Chen Hsiao-en
  So Kai Man
  Farhad Moravveji
  Yosuke Takebe
  Ramina Tsoi
  Mohammad Bin Tan
  Nasser Al-Busaidi
  Ali Muhammad
  Heba Saadieh
  Faisal Al-Shammari
  Jang Jong-pil
  Vafo Karaev
  Ahmed Al-Rashdi
  Sanjar Shayusupov

Draw
The draw of the final tournament was held on 26 October 2022, 12:00 UZT (UTC+5), in Tashkent, Uzbekistan. The 16 teams were drawn into four groups of four teams, with the teams seeded according to their performance in the 2018 AFC U-19 Championship final tournament and qualification, with the hosts Uzbekistan automatically seeded and assigned to Position A1 in the draw.

Squads

Players born on or after 1 January 2003 and on or before 31 December 2007 were eligible to compete in the tournament. Each team must register a squad of minimum 18 players and maximum 23 players, minimum three of whom must be goalkeepers.

Group stage
The top two teams of each group advanced to the quarter-finals.

Tiebreakers
Teams were ranked according to points (3 points for a win, 1 point for a draw, 0 points for a loss), and if tied on points, the following tie-breaking criteria were applied, in the order given, to determine the rankings:
Points in head-to-head matches among tied teams;
Goal difference in head-to-head matches among tied teams;
Goals scored in head-to-head matches among tied teams;
If more than two teams are tied, and after applying all head-to-head criteria above, a subset of teams are still tied, all head-to-head criteria above are reapplied exclusively to this subset of teams;
Goal difference in all group matches;
Goals scored in all group matches;
Penalty shoot-out if only two teams were tied and they met in the last round of the group;
Disciplinary points (yellow card = 1 point, red card as a result of two yellow cards = 3 points, direct red card = 3 points, yellow card followed by direct red card = 4 points);
Drawing of lots.

All match times are in local time, UZT (UTC+5), as listed by AFC.

Group A

Group B

Group C

Group D

Knockout stage
In the knockout stage, extra time and penalty shoot-out are used to decide the winner if necessary.

Bracket

Quarter-finals
Winners qualified for the 2023 FIFA U-20 World Cup.

Semi-finals

Final

Winners

Awards
The following awards were given at the conclusion of the tournament:

Goalscorers

Discipline
A player or team official is automatically suspended for the next match for the following offences:
 Receiving a red card (red card suspensions may be extended for serious offences)
 Receiving two yellow cards in two matches; yellow cards expire after the completion of the quarter-finals (yellow card suspensions are not carried forward to any other future international matches)

The following suspensions were served during the tournament:

Qualified teams for FIFA U-20 World Cup 
The following five teams from AFC qualified for the 2023 FIFA U-20 World Cup including host Indonesia.

1 Bold indicates champions for that year. Italic indicates hosts for that year.

Notes

See also
2023 AFC U-17 Asian Cup
2024 AFC U-23 Asian Cup qualification

References

 
2023
U-20 Asian Cup
2023 in youth association football
2020s in Uzbekistani sport
International association football competitions hosted by Uzbekistan
2023 FIFA U-20 World Cup qualification
AFC